Kim Sung-min (Hangul: 김성민, born 6 February 1981) is a former South Korean footballer who last played for Jeju United FC in the K League. He also played for Ulsan Hyundai.

References

External links

1981 births
Living people
Association football goalkeepers
South Korean footballers
Ulsan Hyundai FC players
Jeju United FC players
Gimcheon Sangmu FC players
K League 1 players